Abhishek Chatterjee (30 April 1964 – 24 March 2022) was an Indian actor who was known for his work in Bengali cinema. He made his big screen debut alongside veterans such as Sandhya Roy, Prosenjit Chatterjee, Tapas Paul, and Utpal Dutt with the Bengali film Pathbhola (1986) directed by Tarun Majumdar. Lathi (1996 film) by Prabhat Roy,Bakul Priya By swapan Saha

Life
After finishing his secondary schooling at the Baranagore Ramakrishna Mission Ashrama High School, he graduated from the Seth Anandram Jaipuria College of the University of Calcutta.

Death 
Abhishek Chatterjee died on 24 March 2022 from a heart attack at his house in Kolkata. He was 57 and is survived by his wife and daughter.

Filmography

Television

References

External links

 
 Official website
 Abhishek Chatterjee on Facebook

1964 births
2022 deaths
Male actors in Bengali cinema
Bengali male actors
Ramakrishna Mission schools alumni
Seth Anandram Jaipuria College alumni
University of Calcutta alumni
Male actors from Kolkata
20th-century Indian male actors
21st-century Indian male actors
Indian male television actors
Bengali male television actors
Indian male soap opera actors
People from Baranagar
Baranagore Ramakrishna Mission Ashrama High School alumni